Armfield is an English surname, and may refer to:

 Billy Armfield (1904–1985), British athlete
 Constance Armfield (née Smedley; 1876–1941), British artist and playwright
 Dennis Armfield (born 1986), Australian footballer
 Diana Armfield (born 1920), British artist
 Jasmine Armfield (born 1998), English actress
 Jimmy Armfield (1935–2018), English football player and manager
 John Armfield (1797–1871), American slave trader
 Lillian May Armfield (1884–1971), Australian police detective
 Maxwell Armfield (1881–1972), English artist, writer, and illustrator
 Neil Armfield (born c. 1958), Australian director of theatre, film and opera
 Robert Franklin Armfield (1829–1898), Lieutenant Governor of North Carolina
 Thomas Armfield (1851–1931), Australian politician
 William Johnston Armfield (1934–2016), American businessman and philanthropist

English-language surnames